This is a timeline of Afghan history, comprising important legal and territorial changes and political events in Afghanistan and its predecessor states.  To read about the background to these events, see History of Afghanistan. See also the list of heads of state of Afghanistan and the list of years in Afghanistan.

25th century BCE

16th century BCE

7th century BCE

6th century BCE

4th century BCE

1st century BCE

1st century CE

2nd century

4th century

5th century

6th century

7th century

9th century

10th century

11th century

13th century

14th century

16th century

18th century

19th century

20th century

21st century

See also 
 List of years in Afghanistan
 Solar Hijri calendar#In Afghanistan

Cities in Afghanistan:
 Timeline of Kabul
 Timeline of Herat

References

Further reading

External links 
 
 

Years in Afghanistan
Afghan
 Timeline